Donnie Dion Avery (born June 12, 1984) is a former American football wide receiver in the National Football League (NFL). He played college football at Houston and was drafted by the St. Louis Rams in the second round of the 2008 NFL Draft. Avery has also played for the Tennessee Titans, Indianapolis Colts and Kansas City Chiefs.

Early years
At Hastings High School in Alief, Texas, Avery was a First-team All-District selection as both a wide receiver and return specialist as a senior. He helped lead the team to the district championship and an 11-3 record, hauling in 36 passes for 502 yards and two touchdowns to lead the District 19-5A receivers in 2002. He also returned 13 punts for 399 yards and three scores, as well as seven kickoffs for 345 yards and one touchdown, in addition to rushing 16 times for 175 yards and two scores.

College career
In 2007 Avery led the Cougars with a career-high 91 catches for school and conference season-records of 1,456 yards (16.0 average) and seven touchdowns. He was a First-team All-Conference USA selection. As a junior, in 2006, he caught 57 passes for 852 (14.9 average) yards and 5 touchdowns. In 2006, he played in 12 games, starting 10 and caught 44 passes for 688 yards and five touchdowns. He was named to the Conference USA All-Freshman team in 2004. Started 11 games as a redshirt freshman finishing fourth on the team with 18 catches for 343 yards and three punt returns for 28 yards (9.3 avg.) He redshirted as a true freshman in 2003.

Professional career

Pre-draft

St. Louis Rams
He was drafted by the Rams in the second round of the 2008 NFL Draft. He was the first wide receiver taken in the draft in 2008. On July 26, 2008, Avery signed a four-year, $4.8 million contract which includes 3 million guaranteed. In his rookie season in the NFL, playing for the St. Louis Rams, Donnie Avery caught 53 passes for 674 receiving yards and 3 touchdowns along with 1 rushing touchdown. The Carroll Rosenbloom Award for St. Louis Ram Rookie of the Year went to receiver Donnie Avery after the 2008 NFL Season.
 Avery’s selection was hard earned. Defensive end and first-round pick Chris Long narrowly was edged out by Avery. Avery became the first non-first round pick to earn the honor since linebacker Pisa Tinoisamoa in 2003. In the third preseason game of the 2010 NFL season against the New England Patriots, Avery was carted off the field with a knee injury. Avery missed the entire 2010 season due to that injury. On September 3, 2011, Avery was released by the St. Louis Rams.

Tennessee Titans
On September 28, 2011, Avery signed with the Tennessee Titans.

Indianapolis Colts
Avery signed with the Indianapolis Colts on March 23, 2012. On September 9, 2012, Avery caught a 6-yard touchdown from Andrew Luck. This was Luck's first NFL touchdown pass.

Kansas City Chiefs
On March 12, 2013, Avery signed with Kansas City Chiefs. Avery played in all 16 games for the Chiefs in 2013, catching 40 passes for 596 yards and 2 touchdowns for the year. Avery also played in the wildcard game against the Colts, catching a 79-yard touchdown pass thrown by Alex Smith, however, Kansas City ended up losing the game 44-45.

In week 4 of the 2014 season against the New England Patriots, Avery was removed in the fourth quarter with a possible groin injury. He did not return to the game and later that week traveled to Philadelphia to undergo sports hernia surgery. By the end of week 8, coach Andy Reid said Avery was “making progress.” He ended the 2014 season playing in only 6 games - making 15 receptions for 176 yards - as the Chiefs finished 9-7.

On February 17, 2015, Avery was released by the Chiefs.

Career statistics

References

External links

 Kansas City Chiefs profile

1984 births
Living people
American football wide receivers
Houston Cougars football players
Indianapolis Colts players
Kansas City Chiefs players
St. Louis Rams players
Tennessee Titans players
Players of American football from Houston